Eric William Beresford Woods (12 December 1892 – 12 August 1936) was an Australian rules footballer who played with University. Away from football he was a medical student, and after serving in World War I he returned to Australia and did not continue his VFL career.

Sources

Holmesby, Russell & Main, Jim (2007). The Encyclopedia of AFL Footballers. 7th ed. Melbourne: Bas Publishing.

1892 births
Australian rules footballers from Victoria (Australia)
University Football Club players
Australian military personnel of World War I
1936 deaths